George Washington Howard (born c. 1848) was an American railway worker and trade union functionary. Howard is best remembered as the head of the Brotherhood of Railway Conductors (BRC), a rival to the Order of Railway Conductors (ORC) which was established in 1885 and absorbed into the older organization in 1891. Howard was also the Vice President of the American Railway Union from 1893 to 1894 and was an important figure in the failed Pullman Strike of 1894.

Biography

Early years

George Washington Howard was born about 1848. He began his working career as a newsboy, working on the Evansville and Crawfordsville Railroad.

During the American Civil War, Howard fought for the Union Army for two years, serving in Company F of the 58th Indiana Infantry Regiment.

As a young man Howard worked on railroads in a variety of capacities, running the gamut from the dangerous job of brakeman to general superintendent. Among others, Howard worked on the Louisville, New Albany, and Chicago Railroad, the Ohio and Mississippi Railway, the Atchison, Topeka and Santa Fe Railway, and the Louisville and Nashville Railroad.

Brotherhood of Railway Conductors

In 1885, Howard was the leading figure behind the establishment of a new trade union, the Brotherhood of Railway Conductors (BRC), conceived as a rival to the long established Order of Railway Conductors (ORC), gaining election to the leading position of Grand Chief Conductor.

After half a decade of disunity, the two railway conductors organizations combined in 1891, with the ORC swallowing its fledgling rival.

California streetcar lines

Howard was instrumental in the construction of the lines of the Coronado Beach Company, a transportation company that helped launch the city of Coronado, California, and was involved in the construction of the city streetcar system in neighboring San Diego.

In 1890, Howard returned to the Midwestern United States to assume the role of master of transportation for the Mackey system of railroads in the state of Indiana.

American Railway Union

Howard was elected vice president, under Eugene V. Debs who was elected president, of the American Railway Union (ARU) at the time of its formation in 1893. He spent much of 1894 on the road speaking on behalf of the organization. One contemporary observer, upon hearing Howard speak at an ARU organizing meeting in Brazil, Indiana, remarked:

"Mr. Howard is a rapid speaker and has foiled the brightest stenographers who have attempted to catch the elegant language as it flowed from his lips. Mr. Howard is a short, heavy-set fellow, and is alert and active as a cat, and talks with lightning rapidity.... He claimed that the existing orders could not reconcile themselves to perfect federation, and consequently it was necessary to have an order large and broad enough to encompass all classes of railroad employees, thus bringing them closer together and eliminating the prejudices existing in the orders of today."

In August 1894 Howard was called to give testimony on behalf of striking American Railway Union workers before the United States Strike Commission appointed by President Grover Cleveland.  Howard was against the strike and had believed that the strike would not have occurred "had the A.R.U. been strong enough." But the union's involvement in the strike led to a jail term for Debs at Woodstock and a term for Howard at Joliet; Howard became the first US prisoner to be confined at Joliet.

Later years

In April 1895, Howard was the principal organizer of a new industrial union, the American Industrial Union (AIU). He was elected General Secretary of that organization at its founding convention, held in the city of Chicago. The AIU platform included the standardization of the eight-hour work day nationwide, settlement of disputes between labor and management through arbitration, women's suffrage (but not women's political participation beyond voting), temperance, and equal pay for women doing the same jobs as men.

By the summer of 1899 Howard had retired from the field of labor organization to become a farmer in Arkansas. Howard's farm was located on the Ouachita River at Witherspoon, about five miles north of Arkadelphia.

Howard did not confine himself to agrarian pursuits in his later years, taking time to lecture on "The Application of Cooperation to Trade Unionism" in Little Rock as late in November 1902.

Notes

References

1848 births
American trade union leaders
People of Indiana in the American Civil War
Year of death missing
American Railway Union people
Trade unionists from Indiana